Gmina Oleśnica may refer to either of the following rural administrative districts in Poland:
Gmina Oleśnica, Lower Silesian Voivodeship
Gmina Oleśnica, Świętokrzyskie Voivodeship